Michael Farrell (born 1965) is a contemporary Australian poet.

Biography

Michael Farrell was born in Bombala, New South Wales in 1965. He presently lives in Melbourne, where he is the Australian editor of Slope magazine.

Published works
 living at the z, 2000
 ode ode, Salt Publishing, 2002.
 a raiders guide, Giramondo, 2008.
 open sesame, Giramondo, 2012.
 Cocky's joy, Giramondo, 2015.
 I Love Poetry, Giramondo, 2017. 
 Family Trees, Giramondo, 2020. 
 Googlecholia, Giramondo, 2022.

Awards

 Harri Jones Memorial Prize, 1999: winner
 The Age Book of the Year Poetry Prize Dinny O'Hearn Poetry Prize, 2003, shortlisted for Ode Ode
Queensland Literary Awards, Judith Wright Calanthe Award for a Poetry Collection, 2018, winner for I Love Poetry
NSW Premier's Literary Awards, Kenneth Slessor Prize for Poetry, 2019, shortlisted for I Love Poetry

References

External links
 Biography and list of works at Austlit: The Australian Literature Resource
 Author page on Poetry International Web
 Salt Publishing

1965 births
Living people
Australian male poets
People from Bombala, New South Wales